Carolynne Cunningham is an Australian film producer and assistant director most known for her collaborations with director Peter Jackson, producing such films as King Kong (2005), District 9, The Lovely Bones (both 2009), and The Hobbit film series (2012–2014).  She also served as assistant director on such notable films as Shine (1996), Pitch Black (2000), Peter Pan (2003), King Kong, The Lovely Bones, and all three entries in The Lord of the Rings trilogy (2001, 2002, and 2003).

Filmography

Producer

References

External links

Living people
Australian film directors
Australian women film directors
1964 births